Edmond "Ned" Hayes (1876-1946) was an Irish hurler who played as a forward for the Tipperary senior team.

Hayes made his first appearance for the team during the 1899 championship and was a regular member of the starting for the next few seasons. During that time he won one All-Ireland medal and two Munster medals. In 1900, Hayes captained the team to the All-Ireland title. 

At club level Hayes was a multiple county championship medalist with Moycarkey–Borris.

References

 

1876 births
1946 deaths
Moycarkey-Borris hurlers
Tipperary inter-county hurlers
All-Ireland Senior Hurling Championship winners